Green Throttle Games is a video game and video game peripheral developer.

History 

The company was founded by RedOctane founder Charles Huang, Palm, Inc.'s Matt Crowley, and Karl Townsend, the original Palm Pilot's lead engineer. They started the company with $6 million in venture capital with the intention to "develop internal games, support external development, and advance software services". Their first project is software that lets players connect the company's controller to their Android device, which can connect to a television. VentureBeat's Dean Takahashi called their late entry to the market a weakness.

The company launched an affiliate program for Android game developers who helped sell their controllers. Green Throttle Games was purchased by Google in 2014.

Products 

The company's first device was the Atlas controller, styled similarly to the Xbox 360 controller. The controller will be compatible with the GameStick.

References 

Video game companies of the United States
Video game accessories
Game controllers
American companies established in 2012
Google acquisitions